Utley is a surname. Notable people with the surname include:

Adrian Utley (born 1957), British jazz guitarist
Chase Utley (born 1978), American baseball player
Freda Utley (1898–1978), English scholar, activist, and non-fiction author
Garrick Utley (1939–2014), American television journalist
George Utley (1887–1966), English footballer
Jerome Utley (1881–1959), American baseball player and coach, contracting engineer, hotelier and boxing promoter
Justin Utley, American rock singer and songwriter
Mel Utley (1953–2019), American basketball player
Mike Utley (born 1965), American football player
Robert M. Utley (1929–2022), American author and historian 
Stan Utley (born 1962), American professional golfer
Steven Utley (1948–2013), American writer
T. E. Utley (1921–1988), British conservative columnist
Tom Utley (born 1952), British columnist, son of T.E. Utley
William L. Utley (1814–1887), American military officer and politician

See also 
Uttley